Greatest Hits is the first compilation album by American country music band Shenandoah. It was released in 1992 on Columbia Records. The album includes four singles from each of their 1989 album The Road Not Taken and their 1990 album Extra Mile, as well as the new tracks "Any Ole Stretch of Blacktop" and "(It's Hard to Live Up to) The Rock". The former was previously recorded by Collin Raye on his 1991 debut album All I Can Be, and the latter was co-written by Stan Munsey, who would later become the band's keyboardist.

Track listing

Chart performance

References
[ Greatest Hits] at Allmusic

1992 greatest hits albums
Shenandoah (band) albums
Columbia Records compilation albums